Hump Creek may refer to:

 Hump Creek (Corson County, South Dakota)
 Hump Creek (Haakon County, South Dakota)